Mesolimnophila is a genus of crane fly in the family Limoniidae.

Distribution
Chile.

Species
M. hirsutipes Alexander, 1929
M. lutea (Philippi, 1866)

References

Limoniidae
Nematocera genera
Diptera of South America
Endemic fauna of Chile